Javalkheti Plateau is a volcanic plateau within the Caucasus Mountains that covers the Samtskhe-Javakheti region of Georgia, along the border with Turkey and Armenia. Its elevation is over 2,000 m.

Geography 
The plateau is a large grassland plain (alpine steppe) with many wetlands and alpine lakes (six of the largest lakes of Georgia, Tabatskuri, Paravani, Khanchali, Madatapa, Kartsakhi, Saghamo).

The Javalkheti Wetlands are included in the Ramsar List of Wetlands of International Importance.

The plain is crossed from north to south by the Abuli-Samsari Mountain Range, a series of volcanic cones. The western side of the plateau is surrounded by the Javakheti Range.

See also 
 Vanis Kvabebi
 Abul-Samsari Range 
 Mount Didi Abuli 
 Javakheti Range

References 

Lava plateaus
Mountains of Georgia (country)
Landforms of the Caucasus
Volcanoes of Georgia (country)